Muravera is a comune (municipality) in the Province of South Sardinia in the Italian region Sardinia, about  northeast of Cagliari in the Sarrabus.

It is a centre of citrus production as well as a tourist resort, including several fine beaches such as that of Costa Rei.

References

External links 

 

Cities and towns in Sardinia